Joshua Matthew Becker (born August 17, 1958) is an American film and television writer and director and author whose credits include episodes of Xena: Warrior Princess as well as collaborations with Bruce Campbell and Sam Raimi.

Life and career

Early life and education
Josh Becker was born in Detroit, Michigan in 1958. He became fascinated with cinema after seeing How the West Was Won at age six. As a teenager, he made several Super-8 short films with Sam Raimi and Bruce Campbell. He dropped out of high-school at age 16 and completed his GED, then attended several colleges (including Michigan State University), but did not complete his studies. At the age of 17, he moved to Los Angeles, where he worked several mid-to-low level jobs while trying to enter the film industry. He also hitchhiked to Alaska during his period (inspired by the writer Jack London), and recounted his adventures in Alaska Journal, and his later memoir, Going Hollywood.

Film and television career
Josh Becker worked as a production assistant and sound recordist on The Evil Dead (1981), which he later referred to as the most grueling film shoot he'd ever been on. He later made his first feature film, Stryker's War (later retitled Thou Shall Not Kill...Except), at age 25, which co-starred Sam Raimi, after spending several years trying to raise funds for it. Bruce Campbell was originally set to star in the film, and starred in the 45-minute Super-8 demo version of the film, but had to bow out due to Screen Actors Guild union regulations. His second film, Lunatics: A Love Story, was produced and released in 1991, and starred Ted Raimi and Deborah Foreman. He also worked as a production assistant during this period, including on one of Mariah Carey's first music videos.

Becker later directed episodes of several TV shows, including Real Stories of the Highway Patrol. He directed the TV film Hercules in the Maze of the Minotaur, which led to a directing gig on Xena: Warrior Princess that he had for several years. He also directed the black-and-white film Running Time with Bruce Campbell, which was edited to look as if it was filmed in a single continuous shot.

In 1999, Becker wrote, produced, and directed the independent film If I Had A Hammer, about the 1960s folk rock scene. The film has never been released in any format (though it has been screened theatrically several times), and only briefly appeared on YouTube. Becker later directed the two Sci-Fi Channel films Alien Apocalypse (based on his screenplay) and Stan Lee's Harpies.

In 2013 Becker produced the YouTube web series Spine Chillers, directing several episodes. In 2018 Becker returned to feature filmmaking with Morning, Noon, and Night which he also wrote, and which reunites him with editor Kaye Davis, who also edited Running Time and Evil Dead II. In 2020 he followed with another feature, western Warpath starring Thom Matthews and Ted Raimi.

Personal life

Becker is an avid film buff and keeps an extensive list of the films he watches, which is available on his website. He currently resides in Michigan.

Writing
Becker has authored The Complete Guide to Low-Budget Feature Filmmaking detailing the ins and outs of independent filmmaking from his own experience. Bruce Campbell penned the introduction.

His second book, Rushes, a collection of essays previously available on his website, was published in 2008.

His third book, Going Hollywood, which details his time in Hollywood upon first arriving in 1976, and his adventures in Alaska, was Released in 2010.

In 2014 Becker attempted crowdfunding publishing his series of historical fiction novels. One of them, Mann's Revenge, was published as an e-book on Amazon.

Becker has published a number of essays on his website about the film business and film history, as well as a number of film reviews, which are notable for their acidity and brutal honesty. He has frequently bemoaned the current state of cinema and Hollywood, which he sees as purely being motivated by money (instead of artistic and creative intentions) and geared towards the lowest common denominator. He is also an avid fan of classic cinema and the Golden Age of Hollywood, and has written that he considers The Bridge on the River Kwai to be the best film ever made.

He has also reviewed old western films for True West Magazine.

Essays
 Smoking Cigarettes (1996)
 The Need for Structure, Part I (1997)
 The Need for Structure, Part II: We Are Our Own Worst Enemies (1997)
 Reduced Expectations (1997)
 99-Cent Stores (1998)
 Verisimilitude (1998)
 Genius in Film (1998)
 Truth & Lies (1998)
 Stories & Society ("Pleasantville" and "Enemy of the State") (1998)
 Turner Classic Movies: A Blessing on My House (1998)
 The Need for Structure, Part III: Action Movies (1999)
 Stevie the Cat (1999)
 The Need for Structure, Part IV: The Rejection of Older Forms (2000)
 The Need for Structure, Part V: Irony & Theme (2000)
 America: Land of the Stupid Cowboys (2000)
 Reading Books (2000)
 Monsterization (2000)
 The Intentions of Storytelling (2000)
 My History of Writing Machines (2000)
 A Lesser Form (2001)
 Bailing Out on Los Angeles (2001)
 My Patriotic "Orientation" (2003)
 Religion is Evil (2003)
 The Misuse of Presidential Power (2003)
 Dogma 2006: Facing the Post-Star Wars Era (2005)
 Hollywood Movie Studios (2005)
 Bulgarian Impressions (2006)
 Conservatism (2007)
 "Victory" in Iraq is Pure Garbage (2008)
 Religious Freedom (2010)
 The Making of "Intent"'' (2007, rev. 2011)

Selected film and television credits

Bibliography

References

External links 
 
 Beckerfilms.com
 Audio interview with Becker

Interviews
 Exclusive Josh Becker Interview at Deadites Online

1958 births
Living people
American film directors
American television directors